The canton of Meylan is an administrative division of the Isère department, eastern France. Its borders were modified at the French canton reorganisation which came into effect in March 2015. Its seat is in Meylan.

It consists of the following communes:
 
Biviers
Corenc
Domène
Meylan
Montbonnot-Saint-Martin
Murianette
Le Sappey-en-Chartreuse
La Tronche

References

Cantons of Isère